Parker Esse is an American choreographer. Esse began training at 9-years old at the Houston Ballet. After being cast in Fosse on Broadway in 2000, he proceeded to work on dozens of productions in prestigious regional theatres across the United States. In Washington, D.C. he worked as the assistant choreographer in the musical Mame and Babes in Arms. He also choreographed Smokey Joe's Cafe, The Music Man, Carousel and Fiddler on the Roof. In New York directed and choreographed The Best Little Whorehouse in Texas. He was the associate director and choreographer for Lucky Guy at Goodspeed Theatre.

Awards
Esse received the Helen Hayes Award for his choreography of Arena Stage's Oklahoma!. Oklahoma was also the recipient of the New Yorker's Best Performers 2010. In total, he has been nominated for the Helen Hayes Award five times. These nominations included his work on The Music Man in 2013, Smokey Joe's Cafe: The songs of Leiber and Stoller in 2015, and Fiddler on the Roof, also in 2015.

Professional credits

Broadway 
 2009 — Finian’s Rainbow — Associate Choreographer
 2008 — A Tale of Two Cities — Associate Choreographer
 1999 — Fosse — Replacement Performer

Off-Broadway 
 2012 — Rated P for Parenthood — Associate Choreographer
 2009 — Girl Crazy — Associate Choreographer
 2008 — On the Town — Associate Choreographer 
 2008 — Juno — Assistant Choreographer
 2007 — Stairway to Paradise — Assistant Choreographer

Tours  
 2009 — The 101 Dalmatians Musical — Associate Choreographer

Regional performance credits  
 2002 — South Pacific — Arena Stage, "Radio Operator Bob McCaffrey"
 2003 — Camelot — Regional Revival, "Sir Colgrevance"
 2004 — Swing! — North Shore Music Theatre, "Comic Couple"
 2006 — Mame — Kennedy Center Revival, "Ensemble"

Regional production credits  
 2017 — The Pajama Game — Arena Stage, Choreographer
 2017 — Rags — Goodspeed Opera House, Choreographer
 2017 — The Best Little Whorehouse in Texas — Merry Go Round Playhouse, Director/Choreographer
 2016 — Carousel — Arena Stage, Choreographer
 2016 — Little Shop of Horrors — Berkshire Theatre Group, Choreographer
 2016 — West Side Story — Signature Theatre, Choreographer
 2015 — A Wonderful Life — Arena Stage, Choreographer
 2015 — Sweet Charity — Shaw Festival at Festival Theatre, Choreographer
 2015 — Smokey Joe’s Cafe: The songs of Leiber and Stoller, Choreographer
 2014 — Bull Durham — Alliance Theatre, Choreographer
 2013 — A Bed and a Chair: A New York Love Affair — Jazz at the Lincoln Center, Choreographer 
 2012 — Finian's Rainbow — Catholic University Benhamin T. Rome School of Music, Choreographer
 2011 — Follies — The Kennedy Center, Associate Choreographer 
 2009 — Lucky Guy — Goodspeed, associate director, Choreographer
 2008 — Dancing in the Dark — The Old Globe Theatre, Assistant Choreographer
 2007 — Pirates! — Paper Mill Playhouse, Assistant Choreographer
 2006 — Pirates of Penzance — Goodspeed, Assistant Choreographer 
 2006 — Mame — Arena Stage, Assistant Choreographer
 2006 — Damn Yankees — Arena Stage, Assistant Choreographer
 2003 — South Pacific — Arena Stage, Choreographer

References

American choreographers
Living people
Year of birth missing (living people)